Kaamos was a Finnish progressive rock band formed in 1973.

They released one album, Deeds and Talks in 1977 (M&T Production MTLP-7). Album mixed classical and medieval music with folk, blues and funk. Their style was described as "Jethro Tull without the flute"

Members 

Originally in 1973:

 Peter Strohlman (guitar)
 Eero Munter (bass)
 Eero Valkonen (drums)
 Ilkka Poijärvi (organ/keyboards)
 Jimmy Lewman (singer)

As it was common at the time, there were a lot changes of band members. These include:

 Ilpo Murtojärvi (guitar)
 Johnny Gustafsson (singer/drummer)
 Kyösti Laihi (keyboards)
 Jarkko "Jakke" Leivo (bass)
 Eric Gylphe (mixing, guitar)
 Göran "Jocke" Sumelius (lyrics)

References 

Finnish progressive rock groups